Anaconda Copper Mine may refer to one of two mines operated by Anaconda Copper
Anaconda Copper Mine (Nevada)
Anaconda Copper Mine (Montana)